Shadian (also Romanized as Shādīān, Shādeyān, and Shādīyān; also known as Shāh Dahān and Shāh Dehān) is a village in Khorram Dasht Rural District, in the Central District of Kashan County, Isfahan Province, Iran. At the 2006 census, its population was 106, in 39 families.

References 

Populated places in Kashan County